Mangareia is a genus of South Pacific intertidal spiders that was first described by Raymond Robert Forster in 1970.  it contains only two species, both found in New Zealand: M. maculata and M. motu.

References

Araneomorphae genera
Desidae
Spiders of New Zealand
Taxa named by Raymond Robert Forster